The C-35 and C-36 were cipher machines designed by Swedish cryptographer Boris Hagelin in the 1930s. These were the first of Hagelin's cipher machines to feature the pin-and-lug mechanism. A later machine in the same series, the C-38, was designated CSP-1500 by the United States Navy and M-209 by the United States military, who used it extensively.

In 1934, the French military approached Hagelin to design a printing, pocket-size cipher machine; Hagelin carved a piece of wood to outline the dimensions of a machine that would fit into a pocket. He adapted one of his previous inventions from three years earlier: an adding device designed for use in vending machines, and combined it with the pinwheel mechanism from an earlier cipher machine (the B-21). The French ordered 5,000 in 1935. Italy and the USA declined the machine, although both would later use the M-209 / C-38. Completely mechanical, the C-35 machine measured 6 × 4.5 × 2 inches, and weighed less than 3 pounds.

A revised machine, the C-36, was similar to the C-35, but had a different distribution of the lugs on the bars.  Six C-36 machines were purchased by the Swedish Navy for testing in October 1937. Both machines had five pinwheels with 17, 19, 21, 23 and 25 pins, each individually settable, giving a maximum period of 3,900,225 for the machine.  The C-362 revision included a few other improvements, most notably movable lugs instead of fixed.

One variant had a Thai alphabet on the pinwheels, rather than the usual Latin alphabet.

References
 Torbjörn Andersson, The Hagelin C-35/C-36, retrieved 15 November 2005.
 Boris CW Hagelin, The Story of the Hagelin Cryptos, Cryptologia, 18(3), July 1994, pp 204–242.
 David Kahn, The Codebreakers, 1967, 2nd ed 1996, Chapter 13, pp426–427.
 Unknown, information card for a C-36 machine in the Enigma and Friends exhibit at Bletchley Park Museum, 2005.

Further reading
 C. A. Deavours, Solution of C-35 Texts with Partial Key, Cryptologia, 14(2), April 1990 pp162–168.

Encryption devices